Vimal may refer to the following people
Given name
Vimal (actor) (born 1979), Indian Tamil film actor.

Vimal Kumar Chordia (1924–), Indian politician
Vimal Mundada (–2012), Indian politician
Vimal Shah (born 1953), Kenyan businessman, entrepreneur and industrialist 

Surname
Ganga Prasad Vimal (1940–2019), Indian writer
Nikhila Vimal (born 1994), Indian actress
R. S. Vimal, Indian filmmaker
U. Vimal Kumar (born 1962), Indian badminton player

See also
Wimal